Feake is a surname. Notable people with the surname include:

Charles Feake ( 1716–1762), English physician
Christopher Feake (1612–1683), English Congregationalist clergyman
Robert Feake (1602– 1661), New England settler